Patricio Manuel (born July 22, 1985) is an American professional boxer. In 2018, he became the first publicly transgender boxer in the history of the United States to have a professional fight. Manuel is a five-time USA female national amateur boxing champion. He fought his last fight as a woman in 2012 against Tiara Brown. His next bout was after he transitioned, where he took on Hugo Aguilar in 2018, and won by unanimous decision. Manuel went on to make his professional debut in December 2018.

Career
He made his professional debut on a Golden Boy Promotions event on December 8, 2018 in Indio, California, scoring a four-round unanimous decision victory over Hugo Aguilar, with all three judges scoring the bout 39–37. Aguilar only knew of Manuel's transition two days prior to the bout. He stated "For me it's very respectable ... It doesn't change anything for me. In the ring he wants to win and I want to win too."

In May 2019, Manuel was a keynote speaker at the launch event for the San Francisco 49ers LGBTQ+ and allies fan club, held at Levi's Stadium.

In September 2019, Manuel became the new face of Everlast boxing equipment.

Transition
He identified as a man after being a five-time national amateur champion, as well as competing in the 2012 Women's U.S. Olympic Trials. Manuel was eliminated from those trials after being forced to withdraw due to a shoulder injury. He began his transition with hormone treatments in 2013, and he had top surgery in Salt Lake City in 2014.

Personal life
Manuel's mother, who raised him as a single parent with the help of his grandmother and uncles, is Irish American. His father is African American. He now lives with his partner and their pit bull dog, Ginkgo.

Professional boxing record

See also

Parinya Charoenphol, Thai boxer and kathoey
Fallon Fox, the first openly transgender MMA athlete

References

External links

American male boxers
Super-featherweight boxers
Living people
1985 births
American LGBT sportspeople
LGBT boxers
Transgender sportsmen
Transgender men
Sportspeople from Santa Monica, California
LGBT African Americans
African-American boxers
LGBT people from California
American people of Irish descent
21st-century African-American sportspeople
20th-century African-American people